The 2008–09 OFC Champions League was the 8th edition of the Oceanian Club Championship, Oceania's premier club football tournament organized by the Oceania Football Confederation (OFC), and the 3rd season under the current OFC Champions League name. The competition consisted of a home and away group stage, followed by a knockout round. It took place from 2 November 2008 until 3 May 2009.

A qualifying round was due to be played, but due to the withdrawal of the representatives from the Cook Islands and Tuvalu, the entrants from Papua New Guinea automatically gained entry to the main draw. It is unknown why the domestic champions of Tahiti and New Caledonia were unable to participate.

The winner of the tournament was Auckland City of New Zealand, who beat Koloale of the Solomon Islands in the two legged final, claiming Oceania's US$1 million (NZ$1.41 million) berth in the 2009 FIFA Club World Cup in Japan.

Participating teams

Direct to group stage
 Auckland City (New Zealand) – 2007–08 New Zealand Football Championship regular season runner-up
 Ba (Fiji) – 2008 Fiji National League premier
 Koloale (Solomon Islands) – 2007–08 Solomon Islands National Club Championship champion
 Port Vila Sharks (Vanuatu) – 2008 VFF Bred Cup winner
 Waitakere United (New Zealand) – 2007–08 New Zealand Football Championship champion and premier

O-League Preliminary
Entrants
 Hekari United (Papua New Guinea) – 2007–08 Papua New Guinea National Soccer League champion
 Tupapa Maraerenga (Cook Islands)
 Nauti FC (Tuvalu)

Other OFC nations
 Magenta (New Caledonia) – disallowed
 Sinamoga (Samoa) – did not enter
 Tongans (Tonga) – did not enter
 Konica Machine FC (American Samoa) – did not enter
 (Tahiti) – member nation not eligible

Under the rules of the OFC Champions League, the winner of the O-League Preliminary competition replaces the last-placed member nation from the previous year's O-League.

Hekari United automatically qualified to the Group Stage following the withdrawal of the representative clubs from Cook Islands and Tuvalu.

Group stage

Group A

Group B

Final

Auckland City won 9 – 4 on aggregate.

The OFC Champions League winner also advances to the qualifying round of the 2009 FIFA Club World Cup.

Topscorers

References
OceaniaFootball

OFC Champions League seasons
1

pt:Liga dos Campeões da Oceania de 2008